Bang Kruai is a district (amphoe) in the southern part of Nonthaburi province, central  Thailand.

History
The district was created in 1904 and named Bang Yai. Due to its size it was difficult to administer, and thus in 1917 the northern part was split off as minor district (king amphoe), Bang Mae Nang. In 1921 Bang Mae Nang became a full district.

On 19 October 1930 the district was renamed "Bang Kruai", after the geographic shape of district. Kruai is the Thai word for 'cone'. On the same date, Bang Mae Nang received the old name of the district, "Bang Yai".

Geography
Neighbouring districts are (from north clockwise) Bang Yai, Mueang Nonthaburi, the districts Bang Sue, Bang Phlat, Taling Chan, Thawi Watthana of Bangkok, and finally Phutthamonthon (Nakhon Pathom province).

Administration
The district is divided into nine sub-districts (tambons), which are further subdivided into 60 villages (mubans). Since 2002 Bang Kruai itself has had town (thesaban mueang) status. Plai Bang has had township (thesaban tambon) status since 1999. Sala Klang has had township status since 2008. Bang Si Thong has had township status since 2013. There another three tambon administrative organizations (TAO).

References

External links
amphoe.com

Bang Kruai